Salvia weihaiensis is an herb that is native to Shandong province in China, growing along the seashore. Inflorescences are 2-8-flowered verticillasters in terminal racemess or panicles. It is related to Salvia japonica.

Notes

weihaiensis
Flora of China